Sugus is a brand of chewy candy manufactured by the Wrigley Company. It was created in 1931 by the Swiss chocolate company Suchard, which was later acquired by Kraft Foods in 1990. Wrigley acquired the candy business of Kraft Foods including the Sugus brand in 2004.

Description
There are several flavours, including lemon, orange, pineapple, raspberry and cherry, indicated by the colour of the packaging (yellow, orange, blue, red, and bright red, respectively), which is characteristic of the sweet. The classic packaging (which measured 6.3 by 4.5 cm) has rectangular sweets, with white text showing the Sugus name (in lowercase) and the specific flavor (in uppercase), all over the packaging.

Availability
Sugus is sold in Argentina, Belgium, Brunei, Cambodia, China, Hong Kong, Indonesia, Japan, Macau, Malaysia, Mexico, the Philippines, Portugal, Romania, Spain, South Africa, Namibia, Switzerland, Taiwan, Thailand, Uruguay and Vietnam. The brand's Chinese name used in Hong Kong and China is "", which directly translates to "Swiss candy".

References

Brand name confectionery
Wrigley Company brands